José Arley Palacios Palacios (born 10 June 1973) is a retired Colombian football defender. He played in the United States' Major League Soccer, China and Ecuador in addition to his domestic top flight.

References

1973 births
Living people
Colombian footballers
Independiente Medellín footballers
New York Red Bulls players
Miami Fusion players
Atlético Nacional footballers
Xiamen Blue Lions players
Sichuan Guancheng players
Envigado F.C. players
Boyacá Chicó F.C. footballers
Atlético Bucaramanga footballers
América de Cali footballers
Patriotas Boyacá footballers
Association football defenders
Colombian expatriate footballers
Expatriate soccer players in the United States
Colombian expatriate sportspeople in the United States
Major League Soccer players
Expatriate footballers in China
Colombian expatriate sportspeople in China
Expatriate footballers in Ecuador
Colombian expatriate sportspeople in Ecuador
Sportspeople from Antioquia Department